Park Jae-jung (born June 24, 1980) is a South Korean actor. He played the leading role in the television dramas You Are My Destiny (2008) and Joseon Mystery Detective Jeong Yak-yong (2009). Park also appeared in the second season of reality show We Got Married where he was paired with singer-actress Uee.

Filmography

Television series

Film

Variety show

Music video

Theater

Awards and nominations

References

External links
 
 
 Park Jae-jung Fan Cafe at Daum
 
 
 

1980 births
Living people
South Korean male television actors
South Korean male film actors
South Korean male musical theatre actors
South Korean male stage actors
People from Daegu
Dongguk University alumni